The Huab River is an ephemeral river in the Kunene Region of north-western Namibia. Its source is southeast of Kamanjab, from where it flows westwards through Mopane savanna until it reaches the Skeleton Coast and the Atlantic Ocean. Inflows of the Huab are Klein-Omaruru, Sout, Aba-Huab, Ongwati and Klip. The Twyfelfontein World Heritage Site is located on the banks of the Aba Huab.

The scenery is remarkably varied and dramatic: camelthorn, mopane and ana trees line the sides of the riverbed, huge sandy valleys are dotted with gigantic boulder outcrops and rocky hills, red-rock mountains punctuate the horizon, and massive sand dunes studded with black volcanic rocks make the elephants walking below them seem tiny.

The Huab is well known for its Desert elephant population which endangers farming activities but is also a potential tourist attraction.

References

Rivers of Namibia
Geography of Kunene Region